Star anise refers to Illicium verum Chinese star anise, and the spice derived from it. It can also refer to related poisonous plants:

 Illicium anisatum, Japanese star anise, similar in appearance to Illicium verum
 Illicium floridanum, a shrub of the southeastern United States
 Illicium parviflorum, swamp star anise, of the southeastern United States